Joseph Yuhas (born July 19, 1956) is an American politician who served in the New Jersey General Assembly from the 15th Legislative District from 1994 to 1996.

References

1956 births
Living people
Democratic Party members of the New Jersey General Assembly
Politicians from Trenton, New Jersey